Samuel, Sam or Sammy Morris may refer to:

Sportspeople
 Samuel Morris (cricketer) (1855–1931), Australian cricketer
 Sam Morris (footballer, born 1930) (1930–2014), English football player for Chester City
 Sam Morris (footballer, born 1907) (1907–1991), English football player for Sunderland
 Sam Morris (footballer, born 1886) (1886–1969), English football player for Bristol Rovers and Brentford
 Sammy Morris (born 1977), American football player
 Samuel Morris (footballer) (1870–1935), Spanish football player for Barcelona

Others
 Samuel Morris (merchant) (1711–1782), Philadelphia businessman in the era of the American Revolution
 Samuel Morris (soldier) (1734–1812), officer from Philadelphia in the American Revolutionary War
 Samuel Wells Morris (1786–1847), United States Congressman from Pennsylvania
 Samuel Morris (Pennsylvania politician) (1918–1995), Pennsylvania politician
 Samuel Morris (Irish politician) (1846–1920), MP for South Kilkenny, 1894–1900
 Samuel Kaboo Morris (1873–1893), African prince who attended Taylor University
 Sam Morris (activist) (1908–1976), anti-colonial activist from Grenada
 Sam Morris (businessman) (1917–1991), British businessman

See also
Samuel Morison (disambiguation)